The Stanford Mendicants are an all-male a cappella group at Stanford University. The group is Stanford University's first a cappella group. Since its founding in 1963, the group's size has varied from 6 to 19 members. Although they are strictly an a cappella group today, they have performed with instruments in previous generations. The group prides itself on singing a wide range of songs, from gospel to barbershop to pop tunes and original compositions. The Mendicants are known around Stanford's campus for their red blazers and romantic serenades.

History and Accolades 

The Stanford Mendicants was founded in 1963 by Hank Adams, a transfer student from Yale University, with a group of 5 undergraduate men. The group originally rehearsed only a single song before breaking into the dining commons of Branner Hall, an all-women's dormitory at the time, and performing their song during lunch. Adams often recalled, himself tearing up, that during their performance, the women wept, and there was literally "not a dry eye in the house".  Having only rehearsed the one song, they quickly fled through an open window and went immediately back to rehearsal.

Their 1998 album Besides What You See received a 4.2 rating from the Recorded A Cappella Review Board (rarb.org), which is the group's highest album score to date.

The group was Runner-Up in three categories in the inaugural Contemporary A Cappella Recording Awards (CARAs) in 1992. As of 2020, they have been nominated for six more recording awards since then: in 1999, 2001, 2005, and 2019.

Mendicant songs were selected for Varsity Vocals' "Best of Collegiate A Cappella" compilation album in both 2001 and 2005.

On February 2, 2019, The Stanford Mendicants finished in first place in the ICCA Northern California Quarter-Finals in Redwood City, CA. The Mendicants also took home two individual awards, including Outstanding Soloist, for Austin Zambito-Valente, and Outstanding Choreography, for Khoi Le and Gabe Wieder.

Notable alumni 

 Chris Ayer, Singer and Songwriter 
 Jordan Gelber, actor from the Broadway run of Avenue Q 
 Founding Mendicant Dick Grant, Director of the Pacific Mozart Ensemble
 Founding Mendicant John Frohnmayer, Politician and Professor at Oregon State University
 Joseph Siravo, actor with The Sopranos and Jersey Boys National Tour]]DiscographyUntitled (1964)
 Untitled (1965)A Fellow Needs a Girl (1966)Untitled (1967)Untitled (1969)Untitled (1973)Untitled (1975)Untitled (1977)Untitled (1979)Clean-Cut and Slightly Frayed (1981)Somewhere in Hawaii (1982)Take You Back (1986)Pretending to Care (1987)Aquapella (1989)Just Like That (1991)Feline Casanova (1992)Back For Seconds (1994)Beggars Can't Be Choosers (1996)Besides What You See (1998)Room to Grow (2000)Best Laid Plans (2002)Mendication (2004)Beggar's Dozen (2006)Roses In My Hand (2008)Sh-Boom (2012)Just a Group of Guys (2013)Mendicants At Large (2015)For the Long Haul (2018)Trailblazer (2019)Detour (2021)

 Awards and nominations 

|-
| rowspan="3" | 1992
| rowspan="3" | Contemporary A Cappella Recording Awards
| Best Male Collegiate Album
| Just Like That| style="background: #F4F2B0" | 
| rowspan="3" | 
|-
| Best Male Collegiate Song
| "Long Train Runnin'"
| style="background: #F4F2B0" | 
|-
| Best Male Collegiate Arrangement
| "Brown Eyed Girl"
| style="background: #F4F2B0" | 
|-
| rowspan="3" | 1999
| rowspan="3" | Contemporary A Cappella Recording Awards
| Best Male Collegiate Album
| Besides What You See| style="background: #F4F2B0" | 
| 
|-
| Best Male Collegiate Song
| "Drive"
| 
| rowspan="2" | 
|-
| Best Male Collegiate Soloist
| Brandon Singleton
| 
|-
| 2001
| Contemporary A Cappella Recording Awards
| Best Male Collegiate Song
| "Happy Together"
| 
| 
|-
| 2005
| Contemporary A Cappella Recording Awards
| Best Male Collegiate Song
| "Wake Me Up Before You Go Go" from Mendication| 
| 
|-
| rowspan="2" | 2019
| Contemporary A Cappella Recording Awards
| Best Male Collegiate Song
| "Control" from For the Long Haul''
| 
| 
|-
| A Cappella Video Awards
| Best Male Collegiate Video
| "Kiss the Sky"
| style="background: #F4F2B0" | 
|

ICCA results 

The International Championship of Collegiate A Cappella (ICCA) first judged live a cappella performance competitions in 1996.

See also
List of Stanford University a cappella groups

References

External links 
Stanford Mendicants Official Website
Stanford Mendicants YouTube

Collegiate a cappella groups
Mendicants
Musical groups established in 1963